Iordan Angelescu (15 June 1946 – 12 November 2015) was a Romanian footballer who played as a midfielder.

Honours
Rapid București
Divizia B: 1974–75
Cupa României: 1971–72, 1974–75
Progresul București
Divizia B: 1979–80

References

External links
Iordan Angelescu at Labtof.ro

1946 births
2015 deaths
Romanian footballers
Association football midfielders
Liga I players
Liga II players
FC Sportul Studențesc București players
FC Universitatea Cluj players
FC Rapid București players
CS Corvinul Hunedoara players
FC Progresul București players
Footballers from Bucharest